The 2009 FIBA European Championship, commonly called FIBA EuroBasket 2009, was the 36th FIBA EuroBasket regional basketball championship held by FIBA Europe. The tournament, which was hosted by Poland, began on 7 September and concluded with the final on 20 September 2009. The competition served as a qualification tournament for the 2010 FIBA World Championship in Turkey.

Spain claimed their first EuroBasket title by routing Serbia 85–63 in the final. Greece captured the bronze medal with a 57–56 victory over Slovenia. The four teams to make the semi-finals, plus France and Croatia claimed the six European qualifying places for the 2010 FIBA World Championship. Spain's Pau Gasol was named the tournament MVP.

Venues

The tournament was played at seven venues in seven cities throughout Poland. Each one of the total six groups in the preliminary and the qualifying round was hosted by a single arena, while the entire knockout stage was played at Spodek Arena, Katowice.

Qualification

The draw for the qualifying round took place on 16 February 2008 in Venice, Italy. Poland, as host nation, and the seven top-placed nations in EuroBasket 2007 automatically qualified for the tournament finals. From the qualifying round, the winners of the four groups and the three best second-place teams also advanced to the final round of the event. The ten teams who participated in the qualifying round and did not succeed in going through to the final round had been ranked according to their win–loss records, their win–loss percentages and their goal average coefficients. The first six teams took part in an additional qualifying round, held from 5 to 30 August 2009, the winner of which secured the last ticket for the final tournament.

Qualified teams

Seeding
The draw for the groups of the final tournament took place on 8 November 2008 in Warsaw, Poland. The finalists were divided into four seeding pots, based on the results of the teams in the most recent FIBA Europe official competitions, with the last competition being the most important. Teams from the same group of seeds cannot be drawn against each other.

h Host

r Record, win–loss

a Goal average coefficient, points for/points against

Squads

Each nation fielded a roster of twelve players for the tournament. FIBA rules allow one naturalized player per team. Nineteen players currently on NBA rosters participated in the tournament. France (Tony Parker, Ronny Turiaf, Boris Diaw, Ian Mahinmi, and Nicolas Batum) led the way with five NBA players participating on the team.

Mascot

The Polish Basketball Federation and the Local Organising Committee of EuroBasket 2009 announced at a press conference in Warsaw that they have chosen the European Bison as the official mascot of EuroBasket 2009. The European bison
() is the largest wild animal to be found in Poland's forests. It is estimated that almost one fifth of the world's population of bisons is actually living in Poland. The animal is known for its calm attitude, while its posture and horns are associated with strength and dignity. The name chosen for the event's official mascot is Mieszko. The name has historical significance as it is the name of the first documented Polish ruler who united Poland in the 10th century. Mieszko is wearing a white jersey that shows the logo of the tournament and white shorts with a number 9. There is red on the sides of the jersey and shorts. His footwear is white with red laces.  He is also holding a basketball that says "EuroBasket 2009".

Results

First round

Group A
Venue: Hala Arena, Poznań

|}

Group B
Venue: Hala Olivia, Gdańsk

|}

Group C
Venue: Hala Torwar, Warsaw

|}

Group D
Venue: Hala Stulecia, Wrocław

|}

Second round

Group E
Venue: Łuczniczka, Bydgoszcz

|}

Group F
Venue: Atlas Arena, Łódź

|}

Knockout stage

5th place bracket

Quarterfinals

Classification 5–8

Semifinals

Seventh place game

Fifth place game

Third place game

Final

The final was a rematch of each team's opening game, with the Spaniards attempting to avenge their 66–57 upset loss to the Serbs. Spain raced to a double-digit lead early in the first quarter, en route to an unassailable 52–29 lead at halftime. Serbia didn't catch up to hand Spain their first European Championship. Pau Gasol had a double-double with 18 points and 11 rebounds. Teammate Rudy Fernandez added 13 points and five rebounds. Uroš Tripković and Novica Veličković had 15 points each in a losing effort for the Serbs.

Final standings

Spain, Serbia, Greece, Slovenia, France, and Croatia qualified for the 2010 FIBA World Championship. Turkey previously qualified as hosts of the competition.  Russia, Germany, and Lithuania were later awarded wild card berths to the tournament.

All-Tournament Team
The following players were named to the All-Tournament Team:

 Vassilis Spanoulis
 Miloš Teodosić
 Rudy Fernandez
 Erazem Lorbek
 Pau Gasol (MVP)

Statistics
Note: Only players who participated in at least five games are eligible for statistic charts.

Individual tournament highs

Points

Rebounds

Assists

Steals

Blocks

Minutes

Individual game highs

Team tournament highs

Offensive PPG

Defensive PPG

Rebounds

Assists

Steals

Blocks

Team game highs

Team rosters (Final Four)

 1.  Spain: Pau Gasol, Juan Carlos Navarro, Víctor Claver, Rudy Fernández, Jorge Garbajosa, Sergio Llull, Carlos Cabezas, Ricky Rubio, Felipe Reyes, Marc Gasol, Raúl López, Álex Mumbrú (Coach:  Sergio Scariolo)
 2.  Serbia: Miloš Teodosić, Stefan Marković, Bojan Popović, Uroš Tripković, Ivan Paunić, Milenko Tepić, Nemanja Bjelica, Novica Veličković, Milan Mačvan, Nenad Krstić, Kosta Perović, Miroslav Raduljica (Coach:  Dušan Ivković)
 3.  Greece: Nick Calathes, Giannis Kalampokis, Vassilis Spanoulis, Stratos Perperoglou, Nikos Zisis, Georgios Printezis, Kostas Kaimakoglou, Antonis Fotsis, Kosta Koufos, Ioannis Bourousis, Sofoklis Schortsanitis, Andreas Glyniadakis (Coach:  Jonas Kazlauskas)
 4.  Slovenia: Jaka Lakovič, Goran Dragić, Domen Lorbek, Samo Udrih, Jaka Klobučar, Boštjan Nachbar, Goran Jagodnik, Uroš Slokar, Jurica Golemac, Matjaž Smodiš, Erazem Lorbek, Primož Brezec (Coach:  Jure Zdovc)

FIBA broadcasting rights

See also
Eurobasket 2009 Division B
EuroBasket Women 2009

References

External links

2009 EuroBasket archive.FIBA.com

 
2009–10 in European basketball
2009
2009
Basketball
2009–10 in Polish basketball
September 2009 sports events in Europe
Sports competitions in Warsaw
Sports competitions in Gdańsk
Sport in Poznań
Sport in Wrocław
Sports competitions in Łódź
Sports competitions in Katowice
21st century in Katowice
21st century in Łódź
21st century in Gdańsk
2000s in Warsaw